Ahamus yunnanensis is a species of moth of the family Hepialidae. It was described by  D.R. Yang, C.D. Li and C. Shen in 1992, and is known from Yunnan, China, from which its species epithet is derived.

References

External links
Hepialidae genera

Moths described in 1992
Hepialidae
Moths of Asia